Félix is a Spanish romantic thriller limited television series with comedy elements created and directed by Cesc Gay. It stars 	
Leonardo Sbaraglia, Mi Hoa Lee, Pere Arquillué and Ginés García Millán. It was released by Movistar+ on 6 April 2018.

Premise 
Set in Andorra, the fiction follows the story of Félix, a literature teacher who falls in love with Julia as soon as he meets her. Barely three days after, she disappears, changing the life of Félix forever. Together with Óscar, Félix then embarks on a quixotic quest to find her.

Cast 
Starring
 Leonardo Sbaraglia as Félix.
 Mi Hoa Lee as Julia / May Lin.
  as Óscar, Félix's sidekick.
 Ginés García Millán as Mario, an Andorran police agent.
Other
 Pedro Casablanc.
 Carlos Hipólito.
 Ana Wagener.

Production and release 
Created by Cesc Gay, Félix is a Movistar+ original production. Arnau Bataller and Jordi Prats composed the score. Domingo Corral, Marta Esteban, Ismael Calleja and Fran Araújo were credited as executive producers.

Filming started in March 2017. Following 11 weeks in Andorra, it moved to Barcelona. It was wrapped after 20 weeks. The series consists of 6 episodes with a running time ranging from 45 to 60 minutes.

It was released on 6 April 2018.

Awards and nominations 

|-
| align = "center" | 2018 || 6th  || colspan = "2" | Best Miniseries or TV Movie ||  || 
|}

References 

Andorra in fiction
2018 Spanish television series debuts
2018 Spanish television series endings
2010s Spanish drama television series
Spanish thriller television series
2010s romance television series
Television shows filmed in Andorra
Television shows filmed in Spain